Charadriiformes (from Charadrius, the type genus of family Charadriidae) is a diverse order of small to medium-large birds. It includes about 390 species and has members in all parts of the world. Most charadriiform birds live near water and eat invertebrates or other small animals; however, some are pelagic (seabirds), others frequent deserts, and a few are found in dense forest. Members of this group can also collectively be referred to as shorebirds.

Taxonomy, systematics and evolution
The order was formerly divided into three suborders:

 The waders (or "Charadrii"): typical shorebirds, most of which feed by probing in the mud or picking items off the surface in both coastal and freshwater environments.
 The gulls and their allies (or "Lari"): these are generally larger species which take fish from the sea. Several gulls and skuas will also take food items from beaches, or rob smaller species, and some have become adapted to inland environments.
 The auks (or "Alcae") are coastal species which nest on sea cliffs and "fly" underwater to catch fish.

The  Sibley-Ahlquist taxonomy lumps all the Charadriiformes together with other seabirds and birds of prey into a greatly enlarged order Ciconiiformes. However, the resolution of the DNA-DNA hybridization technique used by Sibley & Ahlquist was not sufficient to properly resolve the relationships in this group, and indeed it appears as if the Charadriiformes constitute a single large and very distinctive lineage of modern birds of their own.

The auks, usually considered distinct because of their peculiar morphology, are more likely related to gulls, the "distinctness" being a result of adaptation for diving.

Families
The order Charadriiformes contains 3 suborders, 19 families and 390 species.
 Suborder Charadrii
 Family Burhinidae – stone-curlews, thick-knees (10 species)
 Family Pluvianellidae – Magellanic plover
 Family Chionidae – sheathbills (2 species) 
 Family Pluvianidae – Egyptian plover 
 Family Charadriidae – plovers (68 species) 
 Family Recurvirostridae – stilts, avocets (10 species) 
 Family Ibidorhynchidae – ibisbill 
 Family Haematopodidae – oystercatchers (12 species) 
 Suborder Scolopaci
 Family Rostratulidae – painted-snipes (3 species) 
 Family Jacanidae – jacanas (8 species) 
 Family Pedionomidae – plains-wanderer 
 Family Thinocoridae – seedsnipes (4 species) 
 Family Scolopacidae – sandpipers, snipes (98 species)
 Suborder Lari
 Family Turnicidae – buttonquails (18 species) 
 Family Dromadidae – crab-plover 
 Family Glareolidae – coursers, pratincoles (17 species) 
 Family Laridae – gulls, terns, skimmers (103 species) 
 Family Stercorariidae – skuas (7 species)
 Family Alcidae – auks (25 species)

Evolution history

That the Charadriiformes are an ancient group is also borne out by the fossil record. Alongside the Anseriformes, the Charadriiformes are the only other order of modern bird to have an established fossil record within the late Cretaceous, alongside the other dinosaurs. Much of the Neornithes' fossil record around the Cretaceous–Paleogene extinction event is made up of bits and pieces of birds which resemble this order. In many, this is probably due to convergent evolution brought about by semiaquatic habits. Specimen VI 9901 (López de Bertodano Formation, Late Cretaceous of Vega Island, Antarctica) is probably a basal charadriiform somewhat reminiscent of a thick-knee. However, more complete remains of undisputed charadriiforms are known only from the mid-Paleogene onwards. Present-day orders emerged around the Eocene-Oligocene boundary, roughly 35-30 mya. Basal or unresolved charadriiforms are:
"Morsoravis" (Late Paleocene/Early Eocene of Jutland, Denmark) - a nomen nudum?
Jiliniornis (Huadian Middle Eocene of Huadian, China) - charadriid?
Boutersemia (Early Oligocene of Boutersem, Belgium) - glareolid?
Turnipax (Early Oligocene) - turnicid?
Elorius (Early Miocene Saint-Gérand-le-Puy, France)
"Larus" desnoyersii (Early Miocene of SE France) - larid? stercorarid?
"Larus" pristinus (John Day Early Miocene of Willow Creek, USA) - larid?
 Charadriiformes gen. et sp. indet. (Bathans Early/Middle Miocene of Otago, New Zealand) - charadriid? scolopacid?
 Charadriiformes gen. et sp. indet. (Bathans Early/Middle Miocene of Otago, New Zealand) - charadriid? scolopacid?
 Charadriiformes gen. et sp. indet. (Bathans Early/Middle Miocene of Otago, New Zealand) - larid?
Charadriiformes gen. et sp. indet. (Sajóvölgyi Middle Miocene of Mátraszõlõs, Hungary
"Totanus" teruelensis (Late Miocene of Los Mansuetos, Spain) - scolopacid? larid?

The "transitional shorebirds" ("Graculavidae") are a generally Mesozoic form taxon formerly believed to constitute the common ancestors of charadriiforms, waterfowl and flamingos. They are now assumed to be mostly basal taxa of the charadriiforms and/or "higher waterbirds", which probably were two distinct lineages 65 mya already, and few if any are still believed to be related to the well-distinct waterfowl. Taxa formerly considered graculavids are:
Laornithidae - charadriiform? gruiform?
Laornis (Late Cretaceous?)
"Graculavidae"
Graculavus (Lance Creek Late Cretaceous - Hornerstown Late Cretaceous/Early Palaeocene) - charadriiform?
Palaeotringa (Hornerstown Late Cretaceous?) - charadriiform?
Telmatornis (Navesink Late Cretaceous?) - charadriiform? gruiform?
Scaniornis - phoenicopteriform?
Zhylgaia - presbyornithid?
Dakotornis
"Graculavidae" gen. et sp. indet. (Gloucester County, USA)

Other wader- or gull-like birds incertae sedis, which may or may not be Charadriiformes, are:
 Ceramornis (Lance Creek Late Cretaceous)
 "Cimolopteryx" (Lance Creek Late Cretaceous)
 Palintropus (Lance Creek Late Cretaceous)
 Torotix (Late Cretaceous)
 Volgavis (Early Paleocene of Volgograd, Russia)
 Eupterornis (Paleocene of France)
 Neornithes incerta sedis (Late Paleocene/Early Eocene of Ouled Abdoun Basin, Morocco)
 Fluviatitavis (Early Eocene of Silveirinha, Portugal)

Evolution of parental care in Charadriiformes

Shorebirds pursue a larger diversity of parental care strategies than do most other avian orders.  They therefore present an attractive set of examples to support the understanding of the evolution of parental care in avians generally. The ancestral avian most likely had a female parental care system. The shorebird ancestor specifically evolved from a bi-parental care system, yet the species within the clade Scolopacidae evolved from a male parental care system.  These transitions might have occurred for several reasons. Brooding density is correlated with male parental care. Male care systems in birds are shown to have a very low breeding density while female care systems in birds have a high breeding density. (Owens 2005). Certain rates of male and female mortality, male and female egg maturation rate, and egg death rate have been associated with particular systems as well. It has also been shown that sex role reversal is motivated by the male-biased adult sex ratio.  The reason for such diversity in shorebirds, compared to other birds, has yet to be understood.

See also
 List of Charadriiformes by population

Footnotes

References
 Bourdon, Estelle (2006): L'avifaune du Paléogène des phosphates du Maroc et du Togo: diversité, systématique et apports à la connaissance de la diversification des oiseaux modernes (Neornithes) ["Paleogene avifauna of phosphates of Morocco and Togo: diversity, systematics and contributions to the knowledge of the diversification of the Neornithes"]. Doctoral thesis, Muséum national d'histoire naturelle [in French]. HTML abstract
 Ericson, Per G.P.; Envall, I.; Irestedt, M. & Norman, J.A. (2003): Inter-familial relationships of the shorebirds (Aves: Charadriiformes) based on nuclear DNA sequence data. BMC Evol. Biol. 3: 16.   PDF fulltext
 Fain, Matthew G. & Houde, Peter (2004): Parallel radiations in the primary clades of birds. Evolution 58(11): 2558–2573.   PDF fulltext
 Gál, Erika; Hír, János; Kessler, Eugén & Kókay, József (1998–99): Középsõ-miocén õsmaradványok, a Mátraszõlõs, Rákóczi-kápolna alatti útbevágásból. I. A Mátraszõlõs 1. lelõhely [Middle Miocene fossils from the sections at the Rákóczi chapel at Mátraszőlős. Locality Mátraszõlõs I.]. Folia Historico Naturalia Musei Matraensis 23: 33–78. [Hungarian with English abstract] PDF fulltext
 Klug, H., M. B. Bonsall, and S.H Alonzo. 2013. Sex differences in life history drive evolutionary transitions among maternal, paternal, and bi‐parental care. Ecology and Evolution. 3: 792–806.
 Liker, A., R. P. Freckleton, and T. Székely. 2013. The evolution of sex roles in birds is related to adult sex ratio. Nature Communications. 4: 1587.
 Owens, I.P. 2002. Male–only care and classical polyandry in birds: phylogeny, ecology and sex differences in remating opportunities. Philosophical Transactions of the Royal Society of London. Series B, Biological Sciences. 357: 283–293.
 Paton, Tara A. & Baker, Allan J. (2006): Sequences from 14 mitochondrial genes provide a well-supported phylogeny of the Charadriiform birds congruent with the nuclear RAG-1 tree. Mol. Phylogenet. Evol. 39(3): 657–667.   (HTML abstract)
 Paton, T.A.; Baker, A.J.; Groth, J.G. & Barrowclough, G.F. (2003): RAG-1 sequences resolve phylogenetic relationships within charadriiform birds. Mol. Phylogenet. Evol. 29: 268–278.   (HTML abstract)
 Székely, T and J.D. Reynolds. 1995. Evolutionary transitions in parental care in shorebirds. Proceedings of the Royal Society of London. Series B: Biological Sciences. 262: 57–64.
 
 Thomas, Gavin H.; Wills, Matthew A. & Székely, Tamás (2004a): Phylogeny of shorebirds, gulls, and alcids (Aves: Charadrii) from the cytochrome-b gene: parsimony, Bayesian inference, minimum evolution, and quartet puzzling. Mol. Phylogenet. Evol. 30(3): 516–526.  (HTML abstract)
 Thomas, Gavin H.; Wills, Matthew A. & Székely, Tamás (2004): A supertree approach to shorebird phylogeny. BMC Evol. Biol. 4: 28.   PDF fulltext Supplementary Material
  Tullberg, B. S., M. Ah–King and H. Temrin. 2002. Phylogenetic reconstruction of parental–care systems in the ancestors of birds. Philosophical Transactions of the Royal Society of London. Series B, Biological Sciences. 357: 251–257.
 van Tuinen, Marcel; Waterhouse, David & Dyke, Gareth J. (2004): Avian molecular systematics on the rebound: a fresh look at modern shorebird phylogenetic relationships. J. Avian Biol. 35(3): 191–194.  PDF fulltext
 Worthy, Trevor H.; Tennyson, A.J.D.; Jones, C.; McNamara, J.A. & Douglas, B.J. (2007): Miocene waterfowl and other birds from central Otago, New Zealand. J. Syst. Palaeontol. 5(1): 1-39.  (HTML abstract)

 
Seabirds
Wading birds
Bird orders
Extant Lutetian first appearances
Eocene taxonomic orders
Oligocene taxonomic orders
Miocene taxonomic orders
Pliocene taxonomic orders
Pleistocene taxonomic orders
Holocene taxonomic orders